Colcord may refer to:

People with the surname
Charles Francis Colcord, businessman and pioneer of the Old West
Joanna Carver Colcord (1882–1960). American seafarer, social worker and writer
Roswell K. Colcord, Governor of Nevada

Places
 Colcord, Oklahoma

Other uses
 Colcord Hotel, a historic boutique hotel in Oklahoma City, Oklahoma